Moose Lake is the only lake along the course of the Fraser River.  It is located along the upper reaches of the river about 3.9 km downstream from the mouth of the Moose River.

Characteristics 

Moose Lake is a long, medium width lake that is wider at its inlet and the farther you move down toward the outlet, the thinner it gets.  It is 11.7 km long and 1.9 km wide at its widest point which is near its inlet.  At its east end, the Fraser flows into the lake after flowing through a marsh.  The river exits the lake at its west end.  The Yellowhead Highway and the Canadian National Railway (Via Rail's Canadian and Jasper-Prince Rupert trains also use the CN tracks) follow the north lake shore closely.

References 

Lakes of British Columbia
Robson Valley
Canadian Rockies
Mount Robson Provincial Park